The Little River is a river in the U.S. state of Virginia.  It rises near Maiden Spring in Tazewell County, Virginia, and empties into the Clinch River in Russell County.

See also
List of rivers of Virginia

References
USGS Geographic Names Information Service
USGS Hydrologic Unit Map - State of Virginia (1974)

Rivers of Virginia
Rivers of Tazewell County, Virginia
Rivers of Russell County, Virginia